The McNary Elementary School District is the K–8 school district for the town of McNary, Arizona, in the United States.  It operates one school, the McNary Elementary School.  The district once was affiliated with a high school, the McNary High School, which closed in 1980.  The old high school, located in the same place where the district and the elementary school now are, used the current district mascot, the Green Devils.  The district superintendent is Mary Ann Wade.

References

External links
 

School districts in Arizona
School districts in Apache County, Arizona